Dylan Bibic (born 3 August 2003) is a Canadian professional road and track cyclist, who currently rides for UCI Continental team . He notably won the scratch race at the 2022 UCI Track Cycling World Championships, the first Canadian to win gold in the event, in his world championship debut. He had previously won the men's points race at the UCI Junior Track World Championships.

Major results

Track

2021
 UCI Junior World Championships
1st  Points race
2nd  Omnium
3rd  Madison
 National Junior Championships
1st  Madison
1st  Elimination
1st  Individual pursuit
1st  Scratch
1st  Points race
1st  Keirin
1st  Sprint
1st  Kilometer
1st  Team pursuit
1st  Team sprint
2022
 1st  Scratch, UCI World Championships
 Pan American Championships
1st  Omnium
1st  Madison (with Michael Foley)
1st  Elimination
2nd  Scratch
 National Championships
1st  Madison (with Mathias Guillemette)
1st  Omnium
 UCI Champions League
1st Elimination, Berlin
2nd Scratch, London
2023
 National Championships
1st  Madison (with Mathias Guillemette)
1st  Omnium
1st  Scratch

Road
2019
 3rd Time trial, National Junior Road Championships

References

External links
 

2003 births
Living people
Canadian male cyclists
Sportspeople from Milton, Ontario
Canadian track cyclists
Cyclists from Ontario
21st-century Canadian people
UCI Track Cycling World Champions (men)